East Wing West Wing is a Hong Kong Drama Series by Zuni Icosahedron, Edward Lam and Mathias Woo production. This drama is a funny and ironic criticism of Hong Kong politics.

Episodes
So far there are 14 episodes:

 2046 CE Bye Bye (2002)
 Reloaded (2002, re-run in 2003)
 Mic On!!! Mic Off!!! (2004)
 West Kowloon Side Story (2005)
 2097 Back to the Ching Chiu (2007)
 Rainbow Judge Pao (2008)
 Hong Kong Civil Servant Death Note (2008)
 West Kowloon Dragon Ball (2009)
 Sap Dai Kau Goon (2010)
 Les Missréblse Hong Kong (2013)
 Find Ghost Do The CE (2014)
 Let It Be One Country Two Systems (2015)
 My Aspiration (2017)
 When There Is No Police (2017)

TV version

East Wing West Wing television version was first aired on ATV Home at 10:00 pm on June 26, 2011 with a total of 13 episodes.

See also
Edward Lam
Mathias Woo
Zuni Icosahedron
Asia Television

External links
Zuni Icosahedron
Asian television
ATV East Palace West Palace website
Editing East Wing West Wing facebook

Hong Kong television shows